Alfred Beesley (1800 – 10 April 1847) was an English topographer and poet.

He was an apprentice to a watchmaker at Deddington, Oxfordshire, but only served a portion of his time, and subsequently devoted himself to literary and scientific pursuits. He died on 10 April 1847, and was buried in Banbury churchyard. He published a collection of poems, and 'The History of Banbury, including copious historical and antiquarian notices' in 1841 in 8 volumes.

References

Attribution

External links
 

1800 births
1847 deaths
English topographers
People from Oxfordshire (before 1974)
People from Banbury
English male poets
19th-century English poets
19th-century English male writers